James William Bailey (1884–unknown) was an English footballer who played in the Football League for Chesterfield Town.

References

1884 births
English footballers
Association football forwards
English Football League players
Ilkeston United F.C. players
Chesterfield F.C. players
Mansfield Town F.C. players
Ripley Town F.C. players
Shirebrook Miners Welfare F.C. players
Year of death missing